Francisco Pedro "Kiki" Tiago Silva (born 14 February 1998) is a Portuguese professional footballer who plays for Casa Pia as a forward.

Club career
On 12 August 2017, Silva made his professional debut with Braga B in a 2017–18 LigaPro match against Académica.

References

External links

1998 births
People from Sintra
Sportspeople from Lisbon District
Living people
Portuguese footballers
Association football forwards
S.C. Braga B players
Leixões S.C. players
Casa Pia A.C. players
Liga Portugal 2 players
Campeonato de Portugal (league) players